Hamadia is a kibbutz in the Beit She'an Valley, just north of Beit She'an in northern Israel. It belongs to the Valley of Springs Regional Council.

Name
The kibbutz took its name from al-Hamidiyya, an abandoned Arab village north of the kibbutz named for the sultan of Ottoman Empire, Abdul Hamid II.

History
The kibbutz was founded in 1939 as part of the Tower and stockade movement.  It was re-established in 1942 by the "Hermonim" pioneers, a garin of native-born Israelis who were part of a youth group.

Archaeology: Hamadiya Neolithic site
Hamadiya is suggested to date between c. 5800 and 5400 BCE. Detailed reports have yet to be published.

Ovens, pits and fireplaces were found with Yarmukian pottery and an assemblage of many axes, picks, scrapers, "saw" elements and sickles. Large saw elements indicate possible earlier Neolithic occupation which was suggested to date at least to the early Chalcolithic (MOM period 7). A flint sickle workshop was located close to the site with over 300 sickle blades found.

Notable people

Nadav Argaman, head of Shin Bet
Gal Nevo, Olympic swimmer

References

Kibbutzim
Kibbutz Movement
Populated places established in 1939
Populated places established in 1942
Neolithic settlements
Neolithic
Prehistoric sites in Israel
1939 establishments in Mandatory Palestine
1942 establishments in Mandatory Palestine
Populated places in Northern District (Israel)